Pia Skrzyszowska (born 20 April 2001) is a Polish athlete specialising in the sprint hurdles. She won gold medals in the 100 metres hurdles at the 2022 European Championships and 2021 European Under-23 Championships.

Skrzyszowska was the 100 m hurdles 2019 European U20 Championship silver medallist. She is a three-time Polish national champion.

Career
Her mother Jolanta Bartczak is a former Olympic long jumper and 1988 European Indoor Championship bronze medallist.

Skrzyszowska finished fifth in the 60 metres hurdles at the home 2021 European Indoor Championships in Toruń.

As of 2022 she won three Polish outdoor titles.

On her 2023 season's debut on 29 January, Skrzyszowska won the 60 m hurdles at the ISTAF Indoor Düsseldorf in Germany in a personal best of 7.84 seconds. Just a few days later, she produced a world-leading 7.78 s at the Orlen Cup in Łódź to come within 0.01 s of Polish national record set by Zofia Bielczyk in 1980.

Achievements

Personal bests
 60 m hurdles – 7.78 (Łódź 2023)
 60 metres indoor – 7.12 (Toruń 2022)
 100 m hurdles – 12.51 (+0.8 m/s, Chorzów 2022) A23R
 100 m hurdles (76.2cm) – 13.35 (+1.2 m/s, Warsaw 2018) 
 100 metres – 11.12 (+1.4 m/s, Kalamata 2022)

International competitions

1Sum of two times

National titles
 Polish Athletics Championships
 100 metres hurdles: 2021, 2022
 100 metres: 2021

References

External links
 

2001 births
Living people
Polish female hurdlers
Athletes (track and field) at the 2018 Summer Youth Olympics
Sportspeople from Warsaw
Athletes (track and field) at the 2020 Summer Olympics
Olympic athletes of Poland
European Athletics Championships winners